Aleksandar Stojanovski (born 23 January 1979) is a Macedonian alpine skier. He competed in the men's giant slalom at the 1998 Winter Olympics.

References

1979 births
Living people
Macedonian male alpine skiers
Olympic alpine skiers of North Macedonia
Alpine skiers at the 1998 Winter Olympics
Sportspeople from Skopje